Filip Reyntjens (born 1952) is professor emeritus at University of Antwerp. His academic training is in constitutional law, but he later pivoted towards the study of politics especially of the Great Lakes region of Africa.

Career 
In 1975, while working as a research assistant at the University of Antwerp, Reyntjens was asked to be involved in a project that involved running a law school at the National University of Rwanda, in Butare. This began a long affiliation with Rwanda. His PhD Thesis: 'Power and Law in Rwanda. Public Law and Political Evolution, 1916-1973' (Original French: Pouvoir et droit au Rwanda. Droit public et évolution politique, 1916-1973), was completed in 1983, and later published as a book in 1985. After this, his research widened from Rwanda to the Great Lakes Region as a whole - publishing work on Burundi and on the Democratic Republic of Congo.

Outside of academia, Reyntjens has been called as an expert witness in cases relating to the Great Lakes region in the courts of multiple nations, as well as before the International Criminal Court and the International Criminal Tribunal for Rwanda. He has also volunteered for Amnesty International.

Selected works

References

1952 births
Living people
Academic staff of the University of Antwerp
Scholars of constitutional law
Historians of Rwanda
Historians of the Democratic Republic of the Congo
Belgian Africanists